The 105th Pennsylvania House of Representatives District is located in South Central Pennsylvania and has been represented since 2023 by Justin C. Fleming.

District profile
The 105th Pennsylvania House of Representatives District is located in Dauphin County. It includes Sand Beach. It is made up of the following areas:

 Lower Paxton Township
 South Hanover Township
 West Hanover Township

Representatives

Recent election results

References

External links
District map from the United States Census Bureau
Pennsylvania House Legislative District Maps from the Pennsylvania Redistricting Commission.  
Population Data for District 105 from the Pennsylvania Redistricting Commission.

Government of Dauphin County, Pennsylvania
105